Mooloolah railway station is located on the North Coast line in Queensland, Australia. It serves the town of Mooloolah Valley in the Sunshine Coast Region.

History
In 2009, the platform was extended at both its northern and southern ends with scaffolding and plywood materials. Initially intended as an interim arrangement until a permanent extension was built, the temporary platform remains. Opposite the platform lies a passing loop.

Services
Mooloolah is serviced by City network services to Brisbane, Nambour and Gympie North. To relieve congestion on the single track North Coast line, the rail service is supplemented by a bus service operated by Kangaroo Bus Lines on weekdays between Caboolture and Nambour as route 649.

Services by platform

References

External links

Mooloolah station Queensland Rail
Mooloolah station Queensland's Railways on the Internet

North Coast railway line, Queensland
Railway stations in Sunshine Coast, Queensland